

Sugar  mills of Mauritius 1948

A  list of Mauritius sugar mills showing those that have disappeared and those still in existence in 1948 (in bold) and being updated for 2017 is detailed below. It is derived from ANNEXE IV of  Pierre de Sornay's 1952 Book, "Isle de France, Ile Maurice" 

La Caroline, Port Louis
Village, Port Louis
Beau Plan, Pamplemousses
L'Industrie||Pamplemousses
Belle Vue Rivet, Pamplemousses
L'Unite (L'union Bourgault), Pamplemousses
Belle Vue Harel (Terra), Pamplemousses
Maison Blanche (Clementine), Pamplemousses
Belle Vue Pilot (Bois Rouge), Pamplemousses
Mauricia (La Louise), Pamplemousses
Bois Mangues, Pamplemousses
Mon Choix, Pamplemousses
Bon Air, Pamplemousses
Mon Desir, Pamplemousses
Bon Espoir, Pamplemousses
Mon Espoir, Pamplemousses
Boulle, Pamplemousses
Mon Rocher, Pamplemousses
California, Pamplemousses
Mont Choisy, Pamplemousses
Constance, Pamplemousses
Mont Piton, Pamplemousses
Elmina, Pamplemousses
Petite Rosalie, Pamplemousses
Fairfund, Pamplemousses
Plessis, Pamplemousses
Fond du Sac, Pamplemousses
Rouge Terre, Pamplemousses
Grande Rosalie, Pamplemousses
Saint Andre (les Rochers), Pamplemousses
L'Amitie (Grand'Garde), Pamplemousses
Solitude, Pamplemousses
L'Agrement, Pamplemousses
Sottise, Pamplemousses
L'Asile, Pamplemousses
The Mount, Pamplemousses
la Nicoliere, Pamplemousses
Triolet, Pamplemousses
La paix, Pamplemousses
Valton, Pamplemousses
L'Esperance Pilot, Pamplemousses
Ville Valio, Pamplemousses
L'Espoir, Pamplemousses
Windsor, Pamplemousses
Antoinette, Riviere Du Rempart
Mare Seche, Riviere Du Rempart
Beau Manguier, Riviere Du Rempart
Melville (Roc en Roc), Riviere Du Rempart
Beau Sejour, Riviere Du Rempart
Mon Losir Rouillard, Riviere Du Rempart
Belle Rive, Riviere Du Rempart
Mon Loisir Lagesse, Riviere Du Rempart
Mapou, Riviere Du Rempart 
Belle Vue Cugnet, Riviere Du Rempart
Mon Songe, Riviere Du Rempart
Belle Vue Maurel, Riviere Du Rempart
Mon Triomphe, Riviere Du Rempart
Belle Vue Robillard, Riviere Du Rempart
Mont Mascal, Riviere Du Rempart
Belmont, Riviere Du Rempart
Moulin, Riviere Du Rempart
Bon Espoir, Riviere Du Rempart
Mont Oreb (Grand'Baie), Riviere Du Rempart
Cottage, Riviere Du Rempart
Petit Village, Riviere Du Rempart
Deux Amis, Riviere Du Rempart
Poudre D'Or, Riviere Du Rempart
Esperance, Riviere Du Rempart
Ravensworth, Riviere Du Rempart
Figette, Riviere Du Rempart
Ravin, Riviere Du Rempart
Forbach, Riviere Du Rempart
Reunion, Riviere Du Rempart
Goodlands, Riviere Du Rempart
Roches Noires, Riviere Du Rempart
Haute Rive, Riviere Du Rempart
Roche Terre, Riviere Du Rempart
Ile D'ambre, Riviere Du Rempart
Saint Antoine, Riviere Du Rempart
Labourdonnais, Riviere Du Rempart
St. Francois (Roche Croix), Riv. Rempart
la Caroline, Riviere Du Rempart
La Lucia, Riviere Du Rempart
Schoenfeld, Riviere Du Rempart
L'Amitie Desjardins, Riviere Du Rempart
The Vale, Riviere Du Rempart
L'Union Delcourt, Riviere Du Rempart
Union Daruty, Riviere Du Rempart
Le Rocher, Riviere Du Rempart
Woodford (La Salette), Riv. Du Rempart
Argy, Flacq
Deep River, Flacq
Australia, Flacq
Etoile Hewetson, Flacq
Beau Bassin, Flacq
Gibraltar, Flacq
Beau Bois, Flacq
Grande Retraite, Flacq
Beau Champ, Flacq
La Gaiete, Flacq
Beau Rivage, Flacq
La Louise, Flacq
Beau Vallon Dubois, Flacq
La lucie (Les Freres), Flacq
Beau Vallon Fabre, Flacq
La Villette, Flacq
Bel Etang, Flacq
L'Union (Alteo), Flacq
Belle Etoile, Flacq
L'Unite, Flacq
Belle Mare, Flacq
Mare Triton, Flacq
Belle Rive, Flacq
Mon Reve, Flacq
Belles Roches (Quatre Cocos), Flacq
Mont Ida, Flacq
Belle Rose, Flacq
Olivia, Flacq
Belle Vue Piat, Flacq
Palmar, Flacq
Belle Vue La Nougarede, Flacq
Petite Retraite, Flacq
Bon Accueil, Flacq
Providence, Flacq
Bon Espoir, Flacq
Quatre Soeurs, Flacq
Bras D'Eau, Flacq
Rich Fund, Flacq
Caroline, Flacq
Riche Mare, Flacq
Example, Flacq
Choisy, Flacq
Saint Julien, Flacq
Clemencia (Magenta), Flacq
Sans Souci, Flacq
Constance, Flacq
Sebastopol, Flacq
Constance Manes, Flacq
Victoria, Flacq
Anse Jonchée, Grand Port
Mon Desert(Mon Tresor), Grand Prt
Astroea, Grand Port
Mont Eulalie (Mt Fernand), Grand Prt
Beau Fond, Grand Port
Mon Tresor, Grand Port
Beau Vallon Rochecouste, Grand Prt
New Grove, Grand Port
Belle Vue, Grand Port
Petit Sable, Grand Port
Bonne Source, Grand Port
Plaisance, Grand Port
Cent Gaulettes, Grand Port
Riche en Eau, Grand Port
Richfield, Grand Port
Cluny, Grand Port
Riviere Creole, Grand Port
Deux Bras, Grand Port
Riviere La Chaux, Grand Port
Eau Bleue, Grand Port
Rose Belle, Grand Port
Ferney, Grand Port
Saint Hubert, Grand Port
Grand Sable, Grand Port
Sauveterre, Grand Port
Gros Bois, Grand Port
Savinia, Grand Port
Hangar, Grand Port
Souffleur, Grand Port
Joli Bois, Grand Port
Union Park (La Perouse), Grand Port
La Rosa, Grand Port
Union Vale (Les Mares Du Tabac), Grand Port
Les Mares, Grand Port
Le Vallon (Beau Vallon Dauban), Grand Port
Valona (Cent Gaulettes puis le Val), Grand Port
La Baraque Savinia Ltd.,, Grand Port
Villeneuve, Grand Port
Mare d'Albert, Grand Port
Virginia, Grand Port
Beau Bois, Savane
La Flora, Savane
Beau Champ, Savane
L'Union Ducray, Savane
Bel Air Hardouin, Savane
L'Union St. Felix, Savane
Bel Air Montocchio, Savane
Luchon (La Foret), Savane
Bel Ombre, Savane
Riche Bois, Savane
Benares, Savane
Riviere des Anguilles, Savane
Bois Cheri (Caledonia), Savane
Rochester, Savane
Britannia, Savane
Constance, Savane
Saint Aubin, Savane
Chamouny, Savane
Saint Avold, Savane
Choisy, Savane
Bel Air Saint Felix, Savane
Colmar, Savane
Constantine, Savane
Sainte Marie, Savane
Combe, Savane
Savannah, Savane
Eastwick Park, Savane
Surinam, Savane
Fontenelle, Savane
Terracine, Savane
Frederica, Savane
Bagatelle, Plaine Wilhems
La Reunion, Plaine Wilhems
Bassin, Plaine Wilhems
Mare aux Vacoas (Good End), Plaine Wilhems
Beau Bassin, Plaine Wilhems
Beau Fond (Bon Accord), Plaine Wilhems
Mon Desir, Plaine Wilhems
Beau Sejour, Plaine Wilhems
Mon Repos Giblot, Plaine Wilhems
Belle Terre, Plaine Wilhems
Millvale, Plaine Wilhems
Bonne Terre, Plaine Wilhems
Mont Roche, Plaine Wilhems
Cascade, Plaine Wilhems
Plaisance, Plaine Wilhems
Chebel, Plaine Wilhems
Clairfonds, Plaine Wilhems
Richelieu, Plaine Wilhems
Ebene, Plaine Wilhems
Roche Brune, Plaine Wilhems
Henrietta (Moneymusk), Plaine Wilhems
Solferino, Plaine Wilhems
Highlands (Vaucluse), Plaine Wilhems
Stanley (Bellevue), Plaine Wilhems
Hollywood, Plaine Wilhems
Tamarin Falls, Plaine Wilhems
La Louise, Plaine Wilhems
Trianon, Plaine Wilhems
La Marie  (Alexandrie),  Plaine Wilhems
Reunion, Plaine Wilhems 
Amitie, Riviere Noire
La Mecque, Riviere Noire
Anna, Riviere Noire
L'Amitie, Riviere Noire
Albion(les Moulins), Riviere Noire
Le Bosquet, Riviere Noire
Beaux Songes, Riviere Noire
Le Morne, Riviere Noire
Belle Isle, Riviere Noire
Magenta, Riviere Noire
Belle Rive, Riviere Noire
Medine, Riviere Noire
Belle Vue, Riviere Noire
Mon Repos, Riviere Noire
Palma, Riviere Noire
Belle Vue, Riviere Noire
Pierrefonds, Riviere Noire
Riviere Dragon, Riviere Noire
Case Noyale, Riviere Noire
Riviere Noire, Riviere Noire
Chamarel, Riviere Noire
Tamarin, Riviere Noire
Cressonville, Riviere Noire
Wolmar, Riviere Noire
Gros Cailloux, Riviere Noire
Walhala, Riviere Noire
La Ferme (La Chaumiere), Riviere Noire
Yemen, Riviere Noire
Agrement, MOKA
Helvetia, MOKA
Alma (Champ D'Or), MOKA
Hermitage, MOKA
Bar-le-Duc, MOKA
La Laura (Pieter Both), MOKA
Beau Bois, MOKA
L'Union Melrose, MOKA
Bon Air, MOKA
Magenta, MOKA
Bonne Veine, MOKA
Midlands, MOKA
Circonstance, MOKA
Minissy, MOKA
Cote D'Or, MOKA
Mon Desert, MOKA
Escalier, MOKA
Roselyn Cottage, MOKA
Esperance, MOKA
Valetta, MOKA

See also 
 Sugar industry of Mauritius

References

Mauritius
Mauritius
Economy of Mauritius
History of Mauritius
Sugar mills
Sugar mills